The Latvian Athletic Association (Latvian Latvijas Vieglatlētikas savienība) is the governing body for the sport of athletics in Latvia.

Affiliations 
World Athletics
European Athletic Association (EAA)
Latvian Olympic Committee

National records 
LVS maintains the Latvian records in athletics.

External links 
Official webpage

Latvia
Athletics
National governing bodies for athletics